The Liga ASOBAL 2013–14 was the 24th season since its establishment. FC Barcelona was the defending champions. The campaign began on Friday, 13 September 2013. The last matchday was played on Sunday, 25 May 2014. A total of 16 teams contested the league, 13 of which had already contested in the 2012–13 season, and three of which were promoted from the División de Plata 2012–13.

FC Barcelona won their fourth title in a row gathering thirteen ASOBAL titles. FC Barcelona also equaled the record of BM Ciudad Real when in 2009-10 season won every match.

The season was marked by the shutdown of BM Atlético Madrid before the start of season due to financial constraints.

Promotion and relegation 
Teams promoted from 2012–13 División de Plata
Juanfersa Grupo Fegar
Ángel Ximénez
Bidasoa Irun

Teams relegated to 2013–14 División de Plata
ARS Palma del Río

Teams dissolved
Atlético Madrid

Teams

Standings

Statistics

Top goalscorers
Full goalscorers list

Top goalkeepers
Full goalkeepers list

See also
División de Plata de Balonmano 2013–14

References

External links
Liga ASOBAL

Liga ASOBAL seasons
1
Spa